Frank Peter Yokas (February 27, 1924 – May 12, 1994) was an American football player who played at the guard position.

A native of Rock Island, Illinois, he attended Rock Island High School, received all-state honors as a football player, and graduated in 1943. He served in the Navy during World War II and played for the Great Lakes Navy and Saint Mary's Pre-Flight football teams. After the war, Yokas was recruited to play college football for Notre Dame, but he told coach Frank Leahy: "Coach, I'll eat them college kids alive." 

Yokas played professional football in the All-America Football Conference (AAFC) for the Los Angeles Dons in 1946 and the Baltimore Colts in 1947. He appeared in a total of 25 AAFC games. 

Yokas died in 1994 in Los Angeles.

References

1924 births
1994 deaths
Los Angeles Dons players
Baltimore Colts (1947–1950) players
Players of American football from Illinois
Sportspeople from Rock Island, Illinois
United States Navy personnel of World War II